Kirikiri (Kirira), or Faia (after its two dialects), is a Lakes Plain language of Irian Jaya, Indonesia. It is spoken in Dofu Wahuka and Paniai villages.

Phonology
Kirikiri does not have many consonant phonemes, but there are many consonant allophones, as in:
/ɸ/ [ɸ, h, β, p]
/t/ [t, d]
/k/ [k, ɡ, x, ɣ]
/b/ [b, β, m, mb]
/d/ [d, n, nd, l, ɾ]
/s/ [s, z, ʃ, ʒ]

Kirikiri, like Doutai, has the fricativized high vowels iʼ and uʼ. There are 7 vowels:

{| 
| iʼ || uʼ
|-
| i || u
|-
| e || o
|-
| a || 
|}

References

Tariku languages
Languages of western New Guinea